Colfer is a surname. Notable people with the surname include:

 Chris Colfer (born 1990), American actor, singer, author, producer, and writer

 Eoin Colfer (born 1965), Irish author and comedian
 Martin Colfer, Irish football (soccer) player
 Ned Colfer (born 1941), Irish hurler, sportsperson
 Terence Colfer, Canadian diplomat